The 2014 World Series by Renault was the tenth season of Renault Sport's series of events, with three different championships racing under one banner. Consisting of the Formula Renault 3.5 Series, Eurocup Formula Renault 2.0 and Eurocup Clio. It was the first season without Eurocup Mégane Trophy.

The series began on 26 April at the Ciudad del Motor de Aragón in Alcañiz, and finished on 19 October at the Circuito de Jerez, just outside Jerez de la Frontera. Round at Jerez replaced Barcelona round, who took place in the series schedule since 2006. Rounds at Red Bull Ring was dropped.

Race calendar
 Event in light blue is not part of the World Series, but is a championship round for the Formula Renault 3.5 Series.

Championships

Formula Renault 3.5 Series

Eurocup Formula Renault 2.0

Eurocup Clio

References

 Linked articles contain additional references.

External links
 Official website of the World Series by Renault

Renault Sport Series seasons